Snapphanar is a Swedish miniseries directed by Måns Mårlind and Björn Stein that aired in three parts on Sveriges Television during Christmas 2006. It is a historical drama about the Snapphane peasant rebel movement that fought against the Swedish rule of Scania in the 17th century. The "Snapphanar" fought secretly for Denmark during 1660–1700.

The miniseries was criticised by historians due to a perceived lack of historical accuracy. The Scanian nationalist attitudes portrayed in the series did not exist in the 17th century and the term snapphane - used for self-identification in the series - was in fact a derogatory term used by Swedes.

Cast
André Sjöberg - Nils Getting 
Tuva Novotny - Hedvig Sparre 
Anders Ekborg - Gabriel Lejonhufvud (Leonsson)
Gustaf Skarsgård - Karl XI (Charles XI of Sweden)
Malin Morgan - Svart-Stina (Black Stina)
Peter Andersson - Överste (colonel) Dahlbergh 
Kim Bodnia - Mogens Laumann 
Jörgen Persson - Räddstor 
Samuel Hellström - Joshua Swartz 
Adam Lundgren - David Swartz 
Dag Malmberg - Anders Sparre 
Harald Leander - Olof Getting 
Jonas Karlström - Jakob Getting 
Niklas Engdahl - Scarred man
Jonas Sjöqvist - Rosencrantz

External links

Films directed by Måns Mårlind
Films directed by Björn Stein
Sveriges Television original programming
Swedish television miniseries